Giorgi Nadiradze (born 12 February 1968) is a Georgian former footballer who played as a defender and made one appearance for the Georgia national team.

Career
Nadiradze earned his first and only cap for Georgia on 27 May 1990 in the country's first international match, a friendly against Lithuania. The home match, which took place in Tbilisi, finished as a 2–2 draw.

Career statistics

International

References

External links
 
 
 

1968 births
Living people
Footballers from Georgia (country)
Georgia (country) international footballers
Association football defenders
FC Metalurgi Rustavi players
FC Torpedo Kutaisi players
FC Samtredia players
FC Zestafoni players
FC Shevardeni-1906 Tbilisi players
Soviet First League players
Soviet Second League players
Erovnuli Liga players